Khandan may refer to:

 Khandan Rural District, rural district in Iran
 Khandaan (1942 film) (pre-Partition Punjabi Urdu film)
 Khandan (1965 film) (Hindi film)
 Khandaan (1979 film), an Indian Hindi-language drama film
 Khandaan (TV series), a 1985 TV series